Secrets of the Luxor is a 1996 adventure video game developed by American studio Mojave and published by Ubi Soft for Macintosh, Windows, and Windows 3.x.

Plot and game-play 
The player is an archaeologist who is exploring an ancient pyramid. Upon discovering a powerful artifact left behind by an ancient civilization, the player must prevent it from being taken by antagonists.

The game features a point-and-click interface and static 3D rendered graphics.

Production 
The game was developed by Mojave, an offshoot of 3D-graphics architects Strata. The hintbook was cowritten by Utah-born Tanya Rizzuti and Adrian Ropp.

Luxor was one of two video game created by Mojave, the other being Sinkha.

In 1998, there was a promotion where German iMac buyers could additionally purchase the Play Max iMac Edition 1 with various titles including Luxor.

Critical reception 

Adventure Gamers felt that the thrilling first third was let down by the remainder of the game. Metzomagic described it as a 'bargain bin purchase'. Tap Repeatedly wrote that while the game was well designed, some of the puzzles seemed to be mind bogglingly hard. Gameboomers appreciated the subtle hits of humour. MacHome liked the " rich plot and exceptional graphics". Eblong wrote that the plot was "cheesy". MacUser's biggest criticism was that "it's so challenging you progress too slowly". The Daily Herald felt that while it was scant on story, its puzzles were too long. Just Adventure described it as "one of the few games to rise above the now-derogatory label of Myst clone". The Age praised the "wonderful 3D-images". MacAddict deemed it visually stunning.

References

External links 

 Main page
 Interview with Just Adventure
Four Fat Chicks interview

1996 video games
Adventure games
Classic Mac OS games
Video games developed in the United States
Video games set in Egypt
Windows games